The reservoir (the "Black Glen") is an impounding reservoir located 9 kilometres north east of the Connel Bridge in Barcaldine Forest. The earthen dam is 23.4 metres high and was completed in 1984. The reservoir provides a supply of water for the hydroelectric scheme at the Marine Resource Centre in the village of Barcaldine.

See also
 List of reservoirs and dams in the United Kingdom

Sources
"Argyll and Bute Council Reservoirs Act 1975 Public Register"
 "The Forests of North Argyll" - The Forestry Commission

Reservoirs in Argyll and Bute